A Farewell to Kings is the fifth studio album by Canadian rock band Rush, released in September 1977 by Anthem Records. After touring their previous album 2112 (1976), which saw the group reach a new critical and commercial peak, they started work on a follow-up. They decided to record at Rockfield Studios in Wales, the first time Rush recorded an album outside of Toronto. The band expanded their sound with each member playing new instruments that he had not previously used, and recorded a mix of concise and long songs.

A Farewell to Kings reached No. 11 in Canada and helped the group to continue to expand its audience  internationally, reaching inside the top-40 in the UK and the US for the first time. "Closer to the Heart" was released as the album's first single, which reached No. 36 in the UK. Rush toured in support of the album from August 1977 to June 1978.  The tour saw the band headline major venues across Canada and play in the UK.

Background and recording

In June 1977 Rush ended their sixteen-month tour in support of their previous album, 2112 (1976). They decided not to take a break and started on a follow-up straight away. Later that month, they retreated to Rockfield Studios in Rockfield, Monmouthshire in Wales to record. This marked the first time that Rush recorded an album outside of Toronto, and Neil Peart recalled the decision to pick a studio suitable enough as "extremely difficult". After longtime Rush producer Terry Brown did some research, he became excited about working in Rockfield and the group chose it. Peart later wrote that the seclusion and the "mellow" atmosphere at the studio created a productive environment for the group to work in, which gave them the opportunity to record outdoors.

The album was recorded in three weeks, followed by two weeks of mixing at Advision Studios in London. Peart said that 2112 made the band sound confined in their sound, so for A Farewell to Kings, the group decided to write material that featured instruments they could play naturally as well as new ones, thus allowing them to play multiple instruments when performing on stage. As a result, A Farewell to Kings features Peart playing orchestra bells, tubular bells, chimes, and other percussion; Geddy Lee playing double neck bass (a Rickenbacker 4080) and Minimoog; and Alex Lifeson on new guitars and for the first time, a Moog Taurus bass pedal synthesizer (used by both Lee and Lifeson). Prior to recording, Rush completed a short tour in 1977 which saw the group perform "Xanadu" prior to recording. Apart from early ideas for "Closer to the Heart", the majority of the album was developed in the studio.

In 2017, Lee considered the album as a particularly important one in regard to his musical development. "I learned a lot; I was learning a lot. I was always challenged and I was very stimulated and the end result was A Farewell to Kings, so I guess it was a pivotal record in that regard." A Farewell to Kings was the first Rush album where synthesizers were an integral part of their sound.

Songs

Side one
"A Farewell to Kings" features birds chirping that were recorded outside the studio. The title originated from an idea Peart had a year before Rush started work on the album, and recalled Lee and Rush manager Ray Danniels pushing him to work it into a song and make it the album's title. The track became one of the band's favourites because, as Peart wrote, "it seems to encapsulate everything that we want Rush to represent."

"Xanadu" opens with birdsong that was also featured on the opening track. It is a fantasy-inspired song that Peart described as "the most complex and multi-textured piece we have ever attempted" at the time of recording. The opening line is taken from the poem Kubla Khan by Samuel Taylor Coleridge. Initially, Peart had an idea based on Citizen Kane before he found Coleridge's poem, the lines of which "etched like a burning image in my head." On the day of recording the song, Rush initially played a run-through of the track to gauge the balance and tone that the microphones were picking up. They performed it a second time once the equipment was set up, and the take was used for the album.

Side two
"Closer to the Heart" was the first song Rush developed for A Farewell to Kings and for a time, was the album's early title. In a lyrical sense, Peart noted that as "A Farewell to Kings" deals with the idea of problems, "Closer to the Heart" addresses solutions. It is based on a verse by Peter Talbot, a friend of the group from Seattle who, in addition to being a writer, worked in the media.

"Cinderella Man" features lyrics written by Lee with assistance from Lifeson, and based on Lee's thoughts and feelings from the romantic comedy film Mr. Deeds Goes to Town (1936), a favourite of his.

"Madrigal" is a love ballad. The drums were recorded in an echo room.

"Cygnus X-1 Book I: The Voyage" is a ten-minute science-fiction song in four distinct sections. The story takes place in outer space in the centre of a black hole named Cygnus X-1, where the character decides to take a closer look in his spaceship, the Rocinante. Peart was inspired by an article about black holes and their origin in Time magazine and went about researching the topic further. The song's arrangement was almost entirely devised by the time Rush had moved into Rockfield Studios. Lee thought that the science-fiction genre presented limitless ideas which gave the band the excuse to "use all your goofy, weird sounds because that's what’s happening out in space." In the tourbook for A Farewell to Kings, Peart wrote that the group had already decided to conclude the story on their next album, which became Hemispheres (1978). It opens with the six-part sequel, "Cygnus X-1 Book II: Hemispheres", forming a song series with a combined length of 28 minutes.

Cover
The cover was designed by longtime Rush collaborator Hugh Syme. He started on the design after Rush had begun recording the album. It features a composite photograph of a Buffalo, NY demolition site with the Harbour Castle Hotel in Toronto in the background, while the foreground depicts a retouched human figure that resembles a "grotesque puppet", all of which represents themes addressed in the title track.

Release
A Farewell to Kings was released in September 1977. In the UK, Phonogram Inc. prepared an extensive advertising campaign for the album to increase the band's profile in the territory.

In November 1977, A Farewell to Kings was one of three Rush albums to be certified gold by the Recording Industry Association of America for selling 500,000 copies. The others were 2112 and All the World's a Stage.

Reception and legacy 

On release, Billboard wrote that "this trio has abated its heavy metal thunder somewhat for a lavishly orchestrated extravaganza that has a rock opera feel to it".

AllMusic's Greg Prato gave the album four out of five stars, saying they "had improved their songwriting and strengthened their focus and musical approach". He took notice of the synthesizers that were creeping into the arrangements, "a direction the band would continue to pursue on future releases". He said "Xanadu" "remains an outstanding accomplishment all these years later". 

Conversely, Village Voice critic Robert Christgau gave the record a D grade, panning Rush as "the most obnoxious band currently making a killing on the zonked teen circuit", comparing them to bands such as Angel, Kansas, and Uriah Heep, "with vocals revved up an octave. Or two."

In the Q & Mojo 2005 Classic Special Edition Pink Floyd & The Story of Prog Rock, the album came in sixth in a list of "40 Cosmic Rock Albums". 

In 2021, American funk metal band Primus embarked on their "A Tribute to Kings" Tour. At each show, Primus played their original material in the first set before covering the entire "A Farewell to Kings" album in their second set. The first leg began August 10, 2021 in Boise, Idaho, and ended October 25 in Phoenix, Arizona. The second leg began April 15, 2022 in Oklahoma City, Oklahoma, and was finished June 25, 2022 in Las Vegas, Nevada.

Tour
Rush toured in support of the album from August 1977 to June 1978. Early into the tour, Rush headlined a sold out gig at the Exhibition Stadium in Toronto in August 1977 that was attended by over 22,000 people. In late 1977, tickets for a 16-date leg across the UK from February 1978 were announced which quickly sold out.

Reissues

Track listing

Personnel 
Rush
Geddy Lee – vocals, bass and twelve-string guitar, Minimoog, bass pedal synthesizers
Alex Lifeson –  electric and acoustic six- and twelve-string guitars, classical guitar, bass pedal synthesizers
Neil Peart –  drums, orchestra bells, wind chimes, bell tree, vibraslap, triangle, tubular bells, temple blocks

Additional personnel
Terry Brown – spoken vocals on "Cygnus X-1 Book I: The Voyage"

Production
Rush – production, arrangement
Terry Brown – production, arrangement, mixing
Terry Brown – recording engineer
Pat Moran – recording engineer
Declan O'Doherty – mixing assistant
Ken Thomas – mixing assistant
George Graves – mastering
Bob Ludwig – remastering
Brian Lee – remastering
Yosh Inouye – cover photography
Hugh Syme – art and graphic direction
Roger Stowell – sleeve photograph
Fin Costello – liner notes photograph

Charts

Certifications

References

External links
 

Rush (band) albums
1977 albums
Anthem Records albums
Atlantic Records albums
Epic Records albums
Mercury Records albums
Sony Music albums
Albums produced by Terry Brown (record producer)
Albums recorded at Rockfield Studios